The Battle of Scary Creek was a minor battle fought during the American Civil War across the Kanawha River from present day Nitro in Putnam County, West Virginia on July 17, 1861.

Background
The battle occurred three months after the beginning of the war and days before the first major battle at Manassas (Bull Run). Union forces under General Jacob Cox began a push up the Kanawha Valley from Ohio.  Confederate General Henry A. Wise commanded a few thousand troops stationed near present-day St. Albans, WV.

Order of Battle

Union
12th Ohio Infantry Regiment - Colonel John Lowe (Union field commander) 
21st Ohio Infantry Regiment - Colonel Jesse S. Norton 
2nd Kentucky Infantry Regiment (Union) - Colonel William E. Woodruff
11th Ohio Infantry Regiment - Colonel Charles A. De Villiers 
George's Independent Ohio Cavalry Company - Captain John S. George
Cotter's Battery of Ohio Light Artillery - Captain Charles S. Cotter 
Barnett's Battery of Ohio Light Artillery - Colonel James Barnett

Confederate 
22nd Virginia Infantry Regiment - Colonel George S. Patton Sr. 
Kanawha Border Rangers - Captain Albert G. Jenkins

Battle
The battle occurred when Union regiments advanced toward the Confederate camp. Lieutenant Colonel George S. Patton, the grandfather of the famous George S. Patton of World War II, commanded the Confederate line behind Harlem Creek, 2 miles from the main Confederate camp. The Union forces engaged the Confederates, launching artillery barrages and musket volleys. The 21st Ohio charged the Confederates with bayonets but were repulsed with casualties. The Union forces began falling back after suffering casualties from the charge.

Post-Battle Confusion
After the Federal forces began falling back, for some reason, the Confederates thought that fresh Union reinforcements were arriving and the result was a retreat by both sides. The Confederates realized their mistake, however, and returned to the battlefield to claim victory.

Aftermath
Despite tactical victory, General Wise, in a highly criticized move, decided to withdraw back up the Kanawha Valley toward the Confederate supply bases in Fayette and Greenbrier Counties. Thus, the victory was hollow for the South. Wise's retreat resulted in most of the Kanawha Valley falling into Union hands.

Casualties were rather light considering the ferocity of the battle. The Union lost 14 killed, approximately 30 wounded, and several missing. The Confederates lost between 1-5 killed, and a half a dozen wounded, including Lieutenant Colonel Patton.

Sources
 Lowry, Terry. The Battle of Scary Creek: Military Operations in the Kanawha Valley, April–July 1861. Quarrier Press; 2 edition (April 1998).

Battles of the Eastern Theater of the American Civil War
Confederate victories of the American Civil War
Battles of the American Civil War in West Virginia
Putnam County, West Virginia
1861 in the American Civil War
1861 in Virginia
July 1861 events